Cunynghame is a surname, and may refer to:

 Arthur Cunynghame (1812–1884), British Army officer and memoirist
 Sir David Cunynghame, 1st Baronet (died 1708), Scottish landowner, lawyer and politician
 James Blair-Cunynghame (1913–1990), Scottish banker
 Sir James Cunynghame, 2nd Baronet (c.1685–1747), Scottish politician 
 Robert James Blair Cunynghame (1841–1903), Scottish surgeon and physiologist
 Sir William Cunynghame, 4th Baronet (1747–1828), Scottish politician